Denver Cuello (born 12 December 1986) is a Filipino professional boxer who challenged for the WBC strawweight title in 2013.

Professional career
Cuello made his professional debut on September 26, 2004, against Marlon Villanueva. The bout took place at the Taytay Gym in Taytay, Rizal and ended in a technical draw early in the fight.

He won the vacant WBC International minimumweight title on April 19, 2009, defeating Japanese boxer Hiroshi Matsumoto via technical knockout in the 4th round. The bout was held at the Smart Araneta Coliseum in Quezon City, Metro Manila, Philippines. He later took on Ruslee Samoh in a non-title bout and won by unanimous dedicion. Cuello defended his title for the first time on November 27, 2009, against Mating Kilakil at the Ynares Plaza Gymnasium in Binangonan, Rizal, Philippines. The defending champion won the fight by technical knockout, again in round 4.

He was scheduled to fight Juan Hernandez from Mexico for the interim WBC minimumweight title on March 27, 2010. The match would be held in Monterrey, Nuevo León, Mexico. However the bout was postponed after the Mexican opponent collapsed in the gym and confined in a hospital. Cuello's manager, Aljoe Jaro, said he'll arrange a tune-up fight for his boxer the fight is delayed over a month.

On March 26, 2011, Cuello defended his WBC championship belt against Samat Chaiyong from Thailand at the Angono Gym in Angono, Rizal. He stopped the Thai challenger via a TKO on the 9th round with the referee stopping the match with still one minute and 12 seconds left in the round. The win improved Cuello's record to 26 wins (with 16 coming by way of knockout) against four losses and six draws.

Professional boxing record 

| style="text-align:center;" colspan="8"|36 Wins (24 knockouts, 12 decisions), 5 Losses (2 knockouts, 3 decisions), 6 Draws
|-  style="text-align:center; background:#e3e3e3;"
|  style="border-style:none none solid solid; "|Res.
|  style="border-style:none none solid solid; "|Record
|  style="border-style:none none solid solid; "|Opponent
|  style="border-style:none none solid solid; "|Type
|  style="border-style:none none solid solid; "|Round, Time
|  style="border-style:none none solid solid; "|Date
|  style="border-style:none none solid solid; "|Location
|  style="border-style:none none solid solid; "|Notes
|- align=center
|Win||36-5-6 || align=left| Boy Tanto
| ||  || 
|align=left|
|align=left|
|- align=center
|Win||35-5-6 || align=left| Ardi Tefa
| ||  || 
|align=left|
|align=left|
|- align=center
|Win||34-5-6 || align=left| Jaipetch Chaiyonggym
| ||  || 
|align=left|
|align=left|
|- align=center
|Loss||33-5-6 || align=left| Xiong Zhao Zhong
| ||  || 
|align=left|
|align=left|
|- align=center
|Win||33-4-6|| align=left| Takashi Kunishige 
| ||  ||
|align=left|
|align=left|
|- align=center
|Win||32-4-6|| align=left| Ivan Meneses
| ||  ||
|align=left|
|align=left|
|- align=center
|Win||31-4-6 || align=left| Ganigan Lopez
| ||  ||
|align=left|
|align=left|
|- align=center
|Win||30-4-6 || align=left| Kid Suryana
| ||  ||
|align=left|
|align=left|
|- align=center
|Win||29-4-6 || align=left| Carlos Perez
| ||  ||
|align=left|
|align=left|
|- align=center
|Win||28-4-6 || align=left| Sebastian Arcos
| ||  || 
|align=left|
|align=left|
|- align=center
|Win||27-4-6 || align=left| Omar Soto
| ||  || 
|align=left|
|align=left|
|- align=center
|Win||26-4-6 || align=left| Wittawas Basapean
| ||  || 
|align=left|
|align=left|
|- align=center
|Win||25-4-6 || align=left| Kongkrai Kiatpracha
| ||  || 
|align=left|
|align=left|
|- align=center
|Win||24-4-6 || align=left| Muhammad Rachman
| ||  || 
|align=left|
|align=left|
|- align=center
|Win||23-4-6||align=left| Arnel Tadena
| ||  || 
|align=left|
|align=left|
|- align=center
|Win||22-4-6 || align=left| Nelson Llanos
| ||  || 
|align=left|
|align=left|
|- align=center
|Loss||21-4-6 || align=left| Juan Hernandez
| ||  || 
|align=left|
|
|- align=center
|Win||21-3-6 || align=left| Samuel Apuya
| ||  || 
|align=left|
|align=left|
|-align=center
|Win||20-3-6 || align=left| Mating Kilakil
| ||  || 
|align=left|
|align=left|
|-align=center
|Win||19-3-6 || align=left| Rusalee Samor
| ||  || 
|align=left|
|align=left|
|-align=center
|Win||18-3-6 || align=left| Hiroshi Matsumoto
| ||  || 
|align=left|
|align=left|
|-align=center
|Win||17-3-6 || align=left| Yanus Emaury
| ||   || 
|align=left|
|align=left|
|-align=center
|Win||16-3-6 || align=left| Benjie Sorolla
| ||   || 
|align=left|
|align=left|
|-align=center
|Win||15-3-6 || align=left| Michael Landero
| ||   || 
|align=left|
|align=left|
|-align=center
|style="background: #B0C4DE"|Draw||14-3-6 || align=left| Armando dela Cruz
| ||   || 
|align=left|
|align=left|
|-align=center
|Win||14-3-5 || align=left| Dennis Juntillano
| ||  || 
|align=left|
|align=left|
|- align=center
|style="background: #B0C4DE"|Draw||13-3-5 || align=left| Rollen Del Castillo
| ||   || 
|align=left|
|align=left|
|- align=center
|Win||13-3-4 || align=left| Armando dela Cruz
| ||  || 
|align=left|
|align=left|
|- align=center
|Win||12-3-4 || align=left| Fabio Marfa
| ||  || 
|align=left|
|align=left|
|- align=center
|Win||11-3-4 || align=left| Carlos Besares
| ||  || 
|align=left|
|align=left|
|- align=center
|Win||10-3-4 || align=left| Steve Demaisip
| ||  || 
|align=left|
|align=left| 
|- align=center
|Win||9-3-4 || align=left| Arnel Tadena
| ||  || 
|align=left|
|align=left|
|- align=center
|Win||8-3-4 || align=left| Rommel Bongon
| ||  || 
|align=left|
|align=left|
|- align=center
|Loss||7-3-4 || align=left| Rey Migreno
| ||  || 
|align=left|
|align=left|  
|- align=center
|Win||7-2-4 || align=left| Michael Rodriguez
| ||  || 
|align=left|
|align=left|  
|- align=center
|Win||6-2-4 || align=left| Pit Anacaya
| ||  || 
|align=left|
|align=left| 
|- align=center
|Win||5-2-4 || align=left| Abdul Simo
| ||  || 
|align=left|
|align=left|
|- align=center
|Win||4-2-4 || align=left| Mark Daguno
| ||  || 
|align=left|
|align=left| 
|- align=center
|style="background: #B0C4DE"|Draw||3-2-4 || align=left| Pit Anacaya
| ||  || 
|align=left|
|align=left|
|- align=center
|Loss||3-2-3 || align=left| Tommy Terado
| ||  || 
|align=left|
|align=left| 
|- align=center
|Win||3-1-3 || align=left| Pit Anacaya
| ||  || 
|align=left|
|align=left| 
|- align=center
|style="background: #B0C4DE"|Draw||2-1-3 || align=left| Archie Mijeyes
| ||  || 
|align=left|
|align=left| 
|- align=center
|style="background: #B0C4DE"|Draw||2-1-2 || align=left| Reymund Legaspi
| ||  || 
|align=left|
|align=left| 
|- align=center
|Win||2-1-1 || align=left| Janry Canete
| ||  || 
|align=left|
|align=left| 
|- align=center
|Win||1-1-1 || align=left| Richard Ignacio
| ||  || 
|align=left|
|align=left| 
|- align=center
|style="background: #B0C4DE"|Draw||0-1-1 || align=left| Marlon Villanueva
| ||  || 
|align=left|
|align=left| 
|- align=center
|Loss||0-1|| align=left| Pit Anacaya
| ||  || 
|align=left|
|

References

External links
 

1986 births
Living people
Mini-flyweight boxers
Southpaw boxers
Sportspeople from Iloilo
World Boxing Council champions
Filipino male boxers
Members of Iglesia ni Cristo
Visayan people